A. Edward "Ted" Toohey (birth registered fourth ¼ 1926 – 26 November 1979) was an English professional rugby league footballer who played in the 1940s, 1950s and 1960s, and coached in the 1970s.

Background
Ted Toohey's birth was registered in Wigan, Lancashire, and his death aged 53 was registered in Wigan, Greater Manchester, England.

Playing career

International honours
Toohey won caps for England while at Barrow in 1952 against Other Nationalities (2 matches), and won caps for Great Britain while at Barrow in 1952 against Australia (3 matches).

Ted Toohey also represented Great Britain while at Barrow between 1952 and 1956 against France (1 non-Test match).

Challenge Cup Final appearances
Ted Toohey played  in Barrow's 0–10 defeat by Wigan in the 1950–51 Challenge Cup Final during the 1950–51 season at Wembley Stadium, London on Saturday 5 May 1951, and played  in the 21–12 victory over Workington Town in the 1954–55 Challenge Cup Final during the 1954–55 season at Wembley Stadium, London on Saturday 30 April 1955, in front of a crowd of 66,513.

County Cup Final appearances
Ted Toohey played left-, i.e. number 4, and scored a try in Wigan's 3–7 defeat by Widnes in the 1945–46 Lancashire County Cup Final during the 1945–46 season at Wilderspool Stadium, Warrington on Saturday 27 October 1945.

Club career
Toohey started his career with hometown club Wigan. He later moved to Barrow, where he formed a successful half-back partnership with stand-off Willie Horne. He also went on to play for Liverpool City.

Coaching career
In 1961, Toohey brought his playing career to an end, and re-joined Wigan as a member of the coaching staff.

References

External links
Statistics at wigan.rlfans.com
(archived by web.archive.org) Back on the Wembley trail

1926 births
1979 deaths
Barrow Raiders players
England national rugby league team players
English rugby league coaches
English rugby league players
Great Britain national rugby league team players
Leigh Leopards captains
Leigh Leopards players
Liverpool City (rugby league) players
Rugby league centres
Rugby league halfbacks
Rugby league players from Wigan
Wigan Warriors coaches
Wigan Warriors players